Thalía con banda: Grandes éxitos is a 2001 compilation album by Thalía. The album was released in August 2001 while successful singles off her Arrasando album were still receiving heavy airplay, like "Arrasando", "Reencarnacion" and "It's My Party."

The album includes ten of Thalía's greatest hits remade in banda style, plus two new banda tracks "La Revancha" and "Cuco Peña" and two bonus remixes of "Piel Morena" and "Amor a la mexicana." The only video filmed from this album was for the mix of "Amor a la mexicana" but the single did not have great success.

Thalía con banda: Grandes éxitos received several music certifications, including a Gold award in Spain, becoming the first banda album in doing so.

Background and production
After the success of Thalía's first three studio albums by EMI, which reached multimillion sales according to Billboard magazine, the singer and her record company decided to launch a record with the hit songs from her previous musical productions with the label but instead of launching a common collection Thalía decided to gather the past hits arranged with the banda style. The bass of the album were recorded in Los Mochis, Sinaloa and about the album Thalía told that it is "completely Mexican music, very much from our roots (…) it is a dream that I always longed for and that I will finally achieve". The album was released at Hacienda de Los Morales, one of the most typical restaurants in Mexico City. The album was produced by Memo Gil and featured arrangements by Adolfo and Omar Valenzuela and Pancho Ruíz, composers of banda musical genre.

Critical reception

The album received favorable reviews from music critics. Drago Bonacich from website AllMusic gave the album four out of five stars. Leila Cobo from Billboard gave the album a favorable review and stands out Thalía's strong vocals even though she complained that the frequent whispered comment in some songs are "distracting". In a report on the album, the ¡HOLA! magazine praised the album and stated that "Thalia is once again at the forefront" and that once again she "surprises us with a totally renewed image. With the new album, she reinvents herself once again, showing why she continues to be number one."

Commercial performance
According to Billboard, Thalía received multiple certifications for its sales in the United States and Latin American. The album had an international success becoming the first Regional Mexican album to be certified in Spain and also entered in markets such as Czech Republic, Portugal, Russia, Canada, Israel, and Bulgaria. Thalía con banda: Grandes éxitos debuted at number 24 at Hungarian Charts, and stayed three weeks at the number one in Greece.

As of September 2001, it received the gold certification in Mexico. In addition, the single "Amor a la Mexicana (version banda)" stayed four weeks at number one in that country. It was certified "Disco De Platino" by the Recording Industry Association of America for shipment of 100,000 copies in the United States.  The album was nominated for a Latin Grammy for Best Banda Album at the 3rd Annual Show in 2002.

Track listing

Charts

Weekly charts

Year-end charts

Certifications and sales

References

Thalía compilation albums
Spanish-language compilation albums
2001 greatest hits albums
EMI Latin compilation albums